Craig Hall (born 6 November 1977) is an Australian former professional rugby league footballer who played in the 2000s. He played in the National Rugby League for the Newcastle Knights between 2003 and 2005.

Background
Hall was born in Hornsby, New South Wales.

Playing career
Hall made his first grade debut for Newcastle against Parramatta in Round 3 2003.  Hall played in the clubs 2003 elimination final loss against the Sydney Roosters.  In 2005, Hall only managed to make 4 appearances in total as Newcastle finished last on the table claiming the wooden spoon.  Hall's last game in first grade was a 50-0 loss against Parramatta in Round 14 2005.

In 2006, it was revealed that Hall was close to signing with English side Wakefield Trinity but the players transfer was cancelled after he suffered a serious knee injury in the 2005 off season.

References

External links
NRL Stats

Living people
1977 births
Australian rugby league players
Newcastle Knights players
Rugby league wingers